William Clay Ford may refer to:

William Clay Ford Sr. (1925–2014), grandson of Henry Ford, son of Edsel Ford and owner, until his death, of the Detroit Lions
William Clay Ford, Jr. (born 1957), great-grandson of Henry Ford, son of William Clay Ford, Sr., chairman of Ford Motor Company
SS William Clay Ford, a Great Lakes freighter owned by the Ford Motor Company
USS Chiwawa (AO-68), a U.S. Navy ship later known as SS William Clay Ford (II)

See also
William Ford (disambiguation)

Ford, William Clay